Brenda Lindiwe Mabaso (Newcastle, KwaZulu-Natal) is an international trade expert, currently based in South Africa.

She is a former board member of FAMSA and being one of the first few women to graduate from the Women on Boards Training and has extensive work experience in Tariff Investigations and SACU Relations, as she has spent the major and most recent part of her career at the International Trade and Administration Commission (ITAC).
She is also part of the Women in Management and Leadership Conference
.

Early life 
Born in Newcastle, part of Northern Natal, Mabaso is the fifth born of father John Tyrell Mabaso and Esther Thembi Mabaso (née Mavuso). During her toddler years, the Mabaso family migrated to Swaziland where her parents were on exile. It is in Swaziland that Mabaso established herself as a top-achiever in her local school, having been recognised as the best student in her class. Her achievements in sports during her senior school years also greatly contributed to her academic success later in life.

Academic achievements 
Mabaso completed her matric at Evelyn Bearing High School. She then completed a Diploma in Commercial Teaching from Swaziland College of Technology (SCOT); a Diploma in Small Business Management from Damelin, and a Diploma in Paralegal Studies (Law) attained from the University of Johannesburg. Her most notable academic achievement is the attainment of a Masters in Business Administration (MBA) from the Durham University Business School in 1999. To date, Mabaso undertakes special Management and Strategic Course as part of furthering her expertise in corporate management.

Career 
Mabaso has extensive work experience in Tariff Investigations and SACU Relations, as she has spent the major and most recent part of her career at the ). She is also part of the Women in Management and Leadership Conference. In addition to her professional roles, Brenda is a former board member of  Families South Africa (FAMSA)  and having been one of the first few women to graduate from the Women on Boards Training Board of Directors.

Other academic achievements include the successful completion and certification in PPP Professional Course with NEPAD Foundation ( 2019), which qualifies her as a CP3 P

Past work experience 

National Assembly (Parliament) of 	South Africa as an 	Advisor

Has worked with National Assembly (Parliament) of South Africa as an Advisor for the Portfolio Committee on Economic 	Development, which entailed advising on oversight on Economic Development entities such as the Competition Commission, 	International Trade Administration Commission, Small Enterprise Finance Agency and providing strategic advice on economic policy development and legislation.

Richards Bay Industrial Zone
Worked for Richards Bay Industrial Zone, where she was providing marketing intelligence and trade analysis on key sectors with investment opportunities. Thus, was instrumental in the development of feasibility studies for the establishment of agro-processing facilities and the Aluminum Hub.

Office of the Premier in Mpumalanga
Worked for Office of the Premier in Mpumalanga as a General Manager for Macro-Policy and at some point, was the Acting Deputy Director-General before joining the Department of Economic Development, heading the Directorate on Business Regulation and Governance for the province.

East London Industrial Development Zone Corporation
Mabaso was a Business Development Manager at ELIDZ from September 2002 to December 2003. She was responsible for formulating and implementing the investment promotion strategy and assist with the development of Small to Medium Enterprises (SMME's). During her tenure at ELIDZ, Mabaso facilitated a successful international investor conference and managed to anchor tenants for the industrial development zone

Trade and Industry 
As the resident marketing deputy director from August 2001 to February 2002, was responsible for designing, promoting and administering trade and industry incentive schemes. In addition, she was responsible for the management of external and internal relations as well as the overseeing of Pilot Projects

Makhosini Secondary School
Mabaso practised as a Commercial Teacher from 1991 to 1994. During her teaching tenure, she achieved a 100% pass rate in all the subjects which she taught

References

South African businesspeople
Living people
1971 births